Bettina Diesner (born 8 February 1970) is an Austrian former professional tennis player.

Diesner competed on the international tour in the 1980s and achieved a career high singles ranking of 272 in the world.

Her best performance on the WTA Tour was a second round appearance at the 1989 Brighton Championships.

ITF finals

Doubles: 5 (2–3)

References

External links
 
 

1970 births
Living people
Austrian female tennis players